Dabudasht District is a district (bakhsh) in Amol County, Mazandaran Province, Iran. Its administrative center is Dabudasht.  At the 2006 census, its population was 74,687, in 19,356 families.  The District has one city: Dabudasht. The District has two rural districts (dehestan): Dabuy-ye Jonubi Rural District and Dasht-e Sar Rural District.

References 

Amol County
Districts of Mazandaran Province